Bruce D. Skaug is an American attorney and politician serving as a member of the Idaho House of Representatives from the 12th district. Elected in November 2020, he assumed office on December 1, 2020.

Early life and education 
Skaug was born in Pocatello, Idaho, and raised in Jerome. He earned an associate degree in social sciences from the College of Southern Idaho, a Bachelor of Science in political science from the University of Idaho, and a Juris Doctor from the University of Idaho College of Law.

Career 
After graduating from law school, Skaug worked as a civil practice attorney. He served as the deputy prosecutor of Ada County, Idaho and was a member of the Nampa City Council from 2014 to 2020. He was elected to the Idaho House of Representatives in November 2020 and assumed office on December 1, 2020.

In 2022, he sponsored legislation to make gender-affirming health care for transgender youths a crime. According to the American Medical Association, the legislation would have adverse effects on the mental and physical health of transgender youths. Although the House Committee agreed to forward the bill, members of the Idaho Senate subsequently refused to advance the legislation.

References 

College of Southern Idaho alumni
Living people
Republican Party members of the Idaho House of Representatives
People from Nampa, Idaho
People from Jerome, Idaho
People from Pocatello, Idaho
University of Idaho alumni
University of Idaho College of Law alumni
Year of birth missing (living people)